John Frederick Wolfenden, Baron Wolfenden, CBE (26 June 1906, Swindon, Wiltshire – 18 January 1985, Guildford, Surrey) was a British educationalist probably best remembered for chairing the Wolfenden Committee whose report, recommending the decriminalisation of homosexuality, was published in 1957. He was headmaster of Uppingham and Shrewsbury public schools.

Early life 
He was the son of George Wolfenden and Emily Hannah Gaukroger, both born in Halifax, Yorkshire. George Wolfenden became an official of the West Riding Education Authority based in Wakefield, Yorkshire, where John attended Queen Elizabeth Grammar School. He won a scholarship to Oxford.

Professional life 
Having studied in Oxford, Wolfenden became a don at Magdalen College, Oxford, in 1929.

John Wolfenden was the headmaster of Uppingham School (1934–1944) and Shrewsbury School (1944–1950) and chairman of various government committees which mostly focused on education and problems with youth.

In 1950 he became Vice-Chancellor of the University of Reading and found time to write two books, Family Affair and The Steele Age, both part of the series of 'Take Home Books'.

From 1954 to 1957 he was Chairman of the Departmental Committee on Homosexual Offences and Prostitution, known in shorthand as the Wolfenden Committee after himself, whose report was published in 1957. Wolfenden had been appointed to head the committee by the then Home Secretary, Sir David Maxwell Fyfe to consider whether the existing laws on these should be changed – although the latter, as Lord Kilmuir, would come to oppose liberalisation of gay rights in the House of Lords. As Geraldine Bedell noted, this was ironic and she also commented: "Perhaps he [Maxwell-Fyfe] thought, by handing over to a committee, to shelve the issue. Perhaps he assumed Wolfenden would find against, in which case, he chose a curious chairman, because Wolfenden had a gay son, Jeremy."

In 1957, Wolfenden chaired an independent committee initiated by the Central Council of Physical Recreation which investigated the role of various statutory and voluntary groups in sport in the United Kingdom. The committee published its report in 1960, and fifty years later it was still an influential work in its field.

In 1962, the Privy Council appointed Wolfenden as Chairman of the Council for the Training of Health Workers and the Council for the Training in Social Work, two bodies established by the Health Visiting and Social Work (Training) Act 1962.

Wolfenden was director of the British Museum from 1969 to 1973, became President of Chelsea College in 1972, Chairman of the Chelsea Building Society and Metropolitan Association of Building Societies in 1978.

Personal life
Wolfenden married in 1932 Eileen, daughter of A.J. Spilsbury, with whom he had two sons and two daughters. His eldest son was Jeremy Wolfenden, a foreign correspondent for The Daily Telegraph and a British spy.

Thoughts and ideas 
In his essay The Gap—The Bridge, Wolfenden discusses the problems with institutional dichotomy.

Titles 
Wolfenden was appointed a Commander of the Order of the British Empire (CBE) in 1942, and was knighted in 1956.

He was created a life peer on 12 July 1974 with the title Baron Wolfenden, of Westcott in the County of Surrey.

See also
 Wolfenden report

References

External links

Stamford Hill Library Plaque
National Portrait Gallery

1906 births
1985 deaths
Academics of the University of Reading
Alumni of Magdalen College, Oxford
Directors of the British Museum
Commanders of the Order of the British Empire
English non-fiction writers
Fellows of Magdalen College, Oxford
Headmasters of Shrewsbury School
Headmasters of Uppingham School
Knights Bachelor
Life peers
Life peers created by Elizabeth II
People educated at Queen Elizabeth Grammar School, Wakefield
Vice-Chancellors of the University of Reading
English male non-fiction writers
20th-century English male writers
Presidents of the Classical Association